Canham Glacier is a tributary glacier about  long which drains the northwest part of Evans Neve in Antarctica. The glacier drains northwest between the Alamein Range and the Salamander Range of the Freyberg Mountains and enters the Rennick Glacier westward of Bowers Peak, Victoria Land. The geographical feature was first mapped by the United States Geological Survey from surveys and from U.S. Navy air photos, 1960–62, and named by the Advisory Committee on Antarctic Names for Lieutenant Commander David W. Canham, Jr., officer in charge of the winter party at the U.S. Naval Air Facility, McMurdo Sound, 1956. The glacier lies situated on the Pennell Coast, a portion of Antarctica lying between Cape Williams and Cape Adare.

Further reading
 Ute Christina Herzfeld, Atlas of Antarctica: Topographic Maps from Geostatistical Analysis of Satellite Radar Altimeter Data, P 165

References 

Glaciers of Pennell Coast